Max, Mon Amour  Max, My Love is a 1986 film directed by Nagisa Ōshima, starring Charlotte Rampling, Anthony Higgins, Victoria Abril, Pierre Étaix and Milena Vukotic. The screenplay was written by Ōshima and Jean-Claude Carrière, and the film was produced by Serge Silberman.

Plot
The movie follows the story of a British diplomat in France whose wife takes a chimpanzee for her lover.

Cast
 Charlotte Rampling as Margaret Jones
 Anthony Higgins as Peter Jones
 Victoria Abril as Maria
 Anne-Marie Besse as Suzanne
 Nicole Calfan as Hélène
 Pierre Étaix as Le détective / Detective
 Bernard Haller as Robert
 Sabine Haudepin as Françoise, la prostituée
 Christopher Hovik as Nelson Jones
 Fabrice Luchini as Nicolas
 Diana Quick as Camille
 Milena Vukotic as Margaret's Mother
 Bernard-Pierre Donnadieu as Archibald (as Bernard Pierre Donnadieu)
 Ailsa Berk as Max (uncredited)

Production
Co-writer Carriere, producer Silberman and actor Vukotic were all frequent collaborators with Luis Buñuel, and the film resembles his work in its understated, unsensational treatment of frequently outrageous events.

Release
The film was entered into the 1986 Cannes Film Festival.

References

External links
 
 
 

1986 films
Films about apes
Films directed by Nagisa Ōshima
1980s French-language films
French satirical films
Japanese satirical films
Zoophilia in culture
Films produced by Serge Silberman
Films with screenplays by Jean-Claude Carrière
English-language French films
1980s French films
1980s Japanese films